The Railway Accident Investigation Unit (RAIU) investigates accidents and incidents on Irish railways. It is an independent investigative agency of the government of the Republic of Ireland, housed within the Department of Transport. The RAIU's head office is in Dublin.

The RAIU's investigations are carried out in accordance with the Railway Safety Act 2005, the Railway Safety Directive 2004/49/EC and Statutory Instrument No. 258 of 2014 European Union (Railway Safety) (Reporting and investigation of serious accidents, accidents and incidents) Regulations 2014.

See also

Air Accident Investigation Unit

References

External links
 Railway Accident Investigation Unit

Government agencies of the Republic of Ireland
Rail accident investigators